Butte County may refer to:
 Butte County, California
 Butte County, Idaho
 Box Butte County, Nebraska
 Butte County, South Dakota